Gran Hermano 16 is the sixteenth season of Gran Hermano, the Spanish version of the reality television series franchise Big Brother. The 16th season started airing on September 13, 2015 on Telecinco with Mercedes Milá hosting the main live shows or "Galas". The grand prize this season is €300,000. The main twist of the season is that every contestant has to keep a secret. In case a competitor reveals voluntarily his secret, they will lose €100,000 of the final prize.

The season was won by 19-year-old Sofía Suescun on Day 102.

Suso was a contestant on Supervivientes: Honduras 2016 where he was the 12th contestant to be voted out, finishing in 4th place.

Niedziela was a contestant on Got Talent España. She became finalist of the contest.

Sofía was a contestant on Supervivientes: Honduras 2018. She was the sole survivor, winning with the 53.8% of the votes. As a result of this, Sofía became the first person ever to win Gran Hermano and Supervivientes and the first Gran Hermano housemate to win Supervivientes.

Suso was a contestant on Gran Hermano VIP 6. After 99 days in the house, he became the runner-up of the season.

Raquel and Sofía were contestants on Gran Hermano Duo. Raquel was the 7th evicted from the house after 51 days. Sofía was the 4th evicted after 31 days in the house but on Day 52 she won the repechage and became an official housemate. She was re-evicted and the 11th evicted on Day 80.

Housemates 

(*) Secret exposed by a rival contestant.
(Italics) Secret exposed by him / herself. (They would have lost €100,000 of the final prize if they had won)

Amanda 
Amanda Rodríguez Morales is a 25-year-old student from Málaga. She describes herself as artificial-looking but natural in spirit. When she entered the house on Day One, her secret remained undisclosed to the audience. In the second week, Sabrina Salerno introduced a medal at the house to play the game of immunity. The following week, several Gym Tony actors introduced another medal for the same game. The organization of Gran Hermano revealed that these medals were a clue to discover another secret. On the Internet photos of Amanda as triple jump champion began to appear. She guessed that Mayte and Sofia were mother and daughter in week 2. Her secret was discovered on the third assembly of secrets. She was the seventh evicted on Day 54 in her third nomination. Her eviction was surprisingly for her: the program made Marina and Amanda believe that they were saved from elimination, then the host connected with them during the ceremony and communicated that Amanda was evicted.

Aritz 
Aritz Castro De las Heras is a 24-year-old from Santurtzi, Biscay. He claims that he does not own a television, he nevers surfs the internet and he has never watched the show before entering the house. His secret is that he is the only contestant without a secret to keep. During the first week, appeared on the Internet several Aritz social networks, as well as his personal blog. He guessed that Marina wasn't mother in week 2. He finished as the runner up on Day 102.

Carlos 
Carlos Rengel Sobreviela is a 25-year-old bar owner from Barcelona. He entered the house on Day One right after his girlfriend Ivy, who was unaware she would also join the competition, along with their dog Hito. Just upon entering the house, he proposed marriage to Ivy, she accepted, and a marriage promise ceremony was conducted immediately. For the rest of the housemates, he had to pretend he did not know Ivy from before. She guessed that Mayte and Sofia were mother and daughter in week 2. Carlos and Ivy's secret was discovered on the third assembly of secrets. Carlos' prize will be reduced in €100,000 in case he wins as a punishment for hinting his secret. He was the thirteenth housemate to be evicted on Day 89.

Carolina 
Carolina Vico Bustamante is a 21-year-old girl from Vidreres, Girona. While she aspires to become a professional model, she takes hairdressing and make up courses and she is also a horsewoman. She affirms she has an extrovert personality but she does not forgive easily if she is hurt. When she entered the house on Day One, her secret remained undisclosed to the audience. During the second gala, Mercedes Milà revealed to the contestants that someone inside the House was able to see ghosts. The following week the program revealed that that person was Carolina. On many nights she woke up frightened and ran to sleep with Marta. Ironically, she was the sixth evicted on Day 47 during a Halloween show.

Enrique 
Enrique Ramos Villarán is a 30-year-old doctor and oncologist from Huelva. A single man, he considers himself romantic, home-loving, honest, distrustful and stubborn. When he entered the house on Day One, his secret remained undisclosed to the audience. In the following weeks, the program revealed that there was a competitor who was considered to be expert in Big Brother. In the last assembly of the secrets, Enrique confessed that he was the expert and that he had watched Big Brother of Spain and of other countries. Many spectators and also many contestants were thinking that he had some type of kinship with Carolina. In the week three, he gained the immunity and he wanted to liberate Han of the nomination instead of to herself, invoking that he wanted to face Suso in nomination. He was the fourth evicted on Day 33. He tried to return to the contest and he lived in the apartment with Mayte, Raquel and Muti until he was eliminated as a third option chosen by the audience.

Han 
Han Wang is a Chinese-born 21-year-old student living in Armilla, Granada with his family, who runs a bazaar store. He describes himself as sociable, very smiling, fun, passionate and unique. He had to pretend he does not speak any Spanish. His secret was revealed on the first "assembly of secrets". He was the fifteenth housemate to be evicted on Day 96.

Ivy 
Tania Mauleón Espinosa is a Mexican-born 22-year-old student residing in Barcelona. After the competition, she wants to move to Australia, where her mother lives, together with her boyfriend Carlos and their dog Ito. She was surprised to see Carlos and Hito enter the house right after her on Day One; Carlos proposed marriage to her right then, she accepted, and a marriage promise ceremony was conducted immediately. For the rest of the housemates, she had to pretend he did not know Carlos from before while she had an affair with Vera. Carlos and Ivy's secret was discovered on the third assembly of secrets and Ito had to moved out of the house. She was the fifth evicted on Day 40. She didn't take part on the repesca.

Maite 
María Teresa (Maite) Galdeano Marañón is a 46-year-old bus driver from Pamplona. She considers herself determined and feisty. Divorced for the last 12 years and a mother of three, she entered the house on Day One along with her daughter Sofía. She had to pretend she did not know Sofía from before. At the same time, she had to pretend Suso is her son; Maite and Suso's secret was revealed on the first "assembly of secrets". Maite and Sofía's secret was revealed on the second assembly of secrets. She was the first evicted on Day 12. She tried to return to the contest and she lived in the apartment with Enrique, Raquel and Muti until she was eliminated as a second option chosen by the audience.

Marina 
Marina Landaluce Rodríguez is a 28-year-old administrative assistant from Motilla del Palancar, Cuenca. She loves cooking. She apparently entered the house with her 1 month old baby Juan, who would stay in an adjacent camera-less room with a babysitter so that she could visit him when needed. It remained unclear to the audience whether her secret was that the baby is unreal. Marina's secret was revealed on the second "assembly of secrets": Juan is one of the three reborn dolls Marina owns. She was the tenth evicted on Day 75.

Marta 
Marta Peñate Amador is a 24-year-old journalism student from Las Palmas. She was surprised to learn she would become a housemate while she was covering the press conference to present the season just days before the competition began. Her secret is that she is the only housemate that knows all the secrets beforehand. Marta' prize will be reduced in €100,000 in case she wins as a punishment for hinting her secret. She was the fourteenth housemate to be evicted on Day 89.

Muti 
Muti Orellana Felipe is a Senegalese origin 22-year-old baker from Seville who works in the family business. His family describes him as a good guy but somehow a bit lazy. He entered the house on Day One as an "invisible" housemate; neither the fellow housemates nor the audience saw his image and did not know where he really was physically. There was a point in the house where he could talk to the rest of the housemates and listen to their conversations. It was later revealed he spent the first days in an adjacent room. On Day 4 he joined the main house physically and was assigned a new secret: he was shown a secret entrance to a place where he can observe his housemates without being seen. He guessed that Mayte and Sofia were mother and daughter in week 2. He was the second evicted on Day 19. He tried to return to the contest and he lived in the apartment with Mayte, Raquel and Enrique until he was eliminated as a fifth option chosen by the audience behind the option that gave the possibility that no one was returning to the contest.

Niedziela 
Niedziela Raluy Swider is a 22-year-old circus performer of Polish descent. Born in Tortosa, Tarragona, she travels around the world with her family's circus. She considers the Gran Hermano house to be her first stable home address. When she entered the house on Day One, she was told one of the two ways to get into the "secret garden", a room that must remain unknown to most of the housemates. She was made believe only Vera and herself know about the secret garden. She guessed that Mayte and Suso weren't mother and son in week 1. In week 3 she was assigned a new secret mission: together with Raquel, she has to make sure everybody in the house gets into the secret garden while Vera remains unaware of the new development. She was the sixteenth housemate to be evicted on Day 101.

Raquel 
Raquel Martín Lozano is a 29-year-old physiotherapist from Moraleja, Cáceres. She considers she is a person that enjoys every minute in her life. When she entered the house on Day One, she was told one of the two ways to get into the "secret garden", a room that must remain unknown to most of the housemates. She was made believe only Vera and herself know about the secret garden. In week 3 she was assigned a new secret mission: together with Nidziela, she has to make sure everybody in the house gets into the secret garden while Vera remains unaware of the new development. She was the third evicted on Day 26. In the repechage, she was the most voted to re-enter the House, with 61.1% of public vote. She won a place in the House as an official housemate again on Day 47. She was reevicted and the eighth evicted on Day 61.

Ricky 
Ricky Natalicchio is a 26-year-old paddle teacher and student from Las Palmas. He was born on Argentina. He entered the house on Day 40, and his secret was that he knows the existence of the apartment, where Raquel, Enrique, Mayte and Muti were living. He was the eleventh evicted on Day 82.

Sofía Suescun 
Sofía Anna Suescun Galdeano is a 19-year-old student from Pamplona. She describes herself as wild, fun and with a sense of humour. She entered the house on Day One along with her mother Maite, with whom she has always been. She had to pretend she did not know Maite, her mother, from outside the reality show. Maite and Sofía's secret was revealed on the second "assembly of secrets". She became the winner on Day 102 with 60.7% of the vote.

Suso 
Jesús (Suso) Álvarez Perera is a 22-year-old shop manager from Barcelona. He affirms he is seducer of women and wants to win the prize to start Penitentiary Social Assistance studies. He had to pretend he is Maite's son, unknowing Sofía is Maite's true daughter. Maite and Suso's secret was revealed on the first "assembly of secrets". She guessed that Mayte and Sofia were mother and daughter in week 2. He was the ninth housemate to be evicted on Day 68.

Vera 
Daniel Vera Bueno (Vera) is a 23-year-old kitchen helper from Sabadell, Barcelona. He loves breakdancing. He wants to win the prize to aid his family economically and start Social Integration studies. He is the only housemate, along with Nidziela and Raquel, to know of the existence of the "secret garden" and how to get into there. He has to make sure Nidziela and Raquel do not know respectively that there is a second woman in the house who knows about the secret garden. He guessed that Han can speak Spanish in week 1. He was the twelfth evicted on Day 82.

Secrets 
In this season, each contestant has to keep a secret while trying to discover the other contestants' one. If someone's reveals his secret, the main prize will be reduced in €100,000, in case of victory. The one who discovers a secret wins a reward, the one who gets his secret revealed gets punished in nominations. Each week, during the main "gala" show, there is an "assembly of secrets".

Nomination table
This season, all Housemates were able to nominate 3 other Housemates each week. The first Housemate listed is nominated for three points, the next Housemate is nominated for two points, while the last Housemate listed is nominated for one point. If a Housemate's secret is discovered, they will lose their right to nominate for three points.

Notes

: On Day 4, Muti left the adjacent room and joined the main House. The public decided with 65% of the public votes that Muti would be exempt from the nominations process this week. 
: Due to the secrets of Han, Maite and Suso being discovered, they are no longer able to nominate with three points. 
: Amanda won the right to automatically nominate a Housemate prior to nominations. She nominated Sofía. 
: Due to the secrets of Marina and Sofía being discovered, they are no longer able to nominate with three points. 
: The Housemates who discovered some secrets this week could save a nominated Housemate, they decided to save Suso. 
: Enrique won immunity in a challenge. 
: Due to the secrets of Amanda, Carlos and Ivy being discovered, they are no longer able to nominate with three points. 
: This week, Housemates had the opportunity to earn an extra 1 or 2 points to nominate an extra Housemate with. Housemates that won extra points have a 1 or 2 listed next to the person they nominated with said points. 
: Enrique won the right to save a nominated housemate in the immunity challenge. He saved Han. 
: Due to the secrets of Aritz, Enrique and Marta being discovered, they are no longer able to nominate with three points. 
: Suso won the right to save a nominated housemate in the immunity challenge. He saved himself. 
: From this round, all the housemates are eligible to nominate with 3, 2 and 1 point. 
: Marina won immunity in the immunity challenge. 
: Ricky entered as a new housemate and for this reason he was exempt from nominations. 
: Raquel won the repechage with 61.1% and returned to the house because of this, she was exempt from nominations. 
: Suso won the right to save a nominated housemate in the immunity challenge. He saved himself. 
: Han won the right to save a nominated housemate in the immunity challenge. He saved himself. 
: Carlos won the right to save a nominated housemate in the immunity challenge. He saved himself. 
: The relatives' housemates made the nominations instead themselves. 
: Carlos' parents won the right to save a nominated housemate in the immunity challenge. They saved their son Carlos. 
: Lines were opened to vote for the winner. The housemate with fewest votes would be evicted.

Nominations total received

Debate: Blind results

Repechage 
The public voting will decide the top ex-housemates to officially return to the Gran Hermano house as official housemates.

The repechage was officially announced on Day 40 (October 22, 2015). All the evicted housemates (Maite, Muti, Raquel and Enrique) are there. They are currently living in the Apartment (Secret Room or House 2). All of them are up for returning to the house with a fifth option of none of them coming back.

Ratings

"Galas" 
 On Thursdays and on Sundays (September 13).

"Debates"

"Última Hora"

External links
 Official site on Telecinco.es
 Gran Hermano Main Site
 "Gran Hermano 24 HOURS LIVE AND FREE" 

2015 Spanish television seasons
GH 16